In complex analysis and numerical analysis, König's theorem, named after the Hungarian mathematician Gyula Kőnig, gives a way to estimate simple poles or simple roots of a function. In particular, it has numerous applications in root finding algorithms like Newton's method and its generalization Householder's method.

Statement 
Given a meromorphic function defined on :

which only has one simple pole  in this disk. Then

where  such that . In particular, we have

Intuition 
Recall that

which has coefficient ratio equal to 

In other words, near x=r we expect the function to be dominated by the pole, i.e.

so that .

References 

Theorems in complex analysis